Chris Parker may refer to:

Popular media 

 Chris Parker (comedian) (born 1990), New Zealand comedian
 Chris Parker (radio) (born 1964), American radio personality
 Chris Parker, English screenwriter and co-creator of the TV series Bedlam
Chris Parker, a fictional character played by Elisabeth Shue in the film Adventures in Babysitting
Chris Parker (musician), American jazz drummer
KRS-One (born 1965), sometimes known as Chris or Kris Parker

Sports 
Chris Parker (rugby league) (born 1982), Gateshead Thunder rugby league player
Chris Parker (quarterback) (born 1964), American football player
Chris Parker (running back) (born 1972), American football player

See also
 Christopher Parker (disambiguation)